Anna Serme (born 15 May 1991 in Krnov), previously known as Anna Klimundová is a Czech professional squash player. As of March 2021, she was ranked No.66 in the world. She is married to French squash player Lucas Serme.

References

1991 births
Living people
Czech female squash players
People from Krnov
Competitors at the 2017 World Games
Competitors at the 2022 World Games
Sportspeople from the Moravian-Silesian Region
20th-century Czech women
21st-century Czech women